Lizzonia was a  Empire F type coaster that was built in 1944 by Goole Shipbuilding & Repairing Ltd, Goole, United Kingdom as Empire Farouche for the Ministry of War Transport (MoWT). In 1946, she was sold and renamed Lizzonia. She was re-engined in 1956 and sank in 1961 following a collision with another vessel.

Description
The ship was built in 1944 by Goole Shipbuilding & Repairing Ltd, Goole, East Riding of Yorkshire. She was yard number 3.

As built, the ship was propelled by a four-stroke Single Cycle, Single Action diesel engine, which had seven cylinders of 8¾ inches (22 cm) diameter by 11½ inches (30 cm) stroke driving a screw propeller. The engine was built by Blackstone & Co, Stamford, Lincolnshire.

History
Empire Farouche was laid down by Goole Shipbuilding & Repairing Ltd, Goole, Yorkshire as CHANT 35 and was renamed Fabric 35 whilst under construction. She was launched as Empire Farouche on 19 September 1944 and completed in October 1944. The Code Letters MLZY and United Kingdom Official Number 180125 were allocated. Her port of registry was Goole. She was operated under the management of J Wharton (Shipping) Ltd.

Empire Farouche was built for the MoWT and was placed under the management of J Wharton (Shipping) Ltd. In 1946, she was sold to her managers and renamed Lizzonia. A new diesel engine was fitted in 1956. Her crew was able to transfer to Arctic Ocean whilst the two ships were locked together. Lizzonia subsequently sank.

References

1944 ships
Ships built in Goole
Empire ships
Ministry of War Transport ships
Merchant ships of the United Kingdom
Ships sunk in collisions
Maritime incidents in 1961
Shipwrecks in the English Channel